Alagich is a surname. Notable people with the surname include:

Dianne Alagich (born 1979), Australian soccer player
Richie Alagich (born 1973), Australian soccer player

References